There are 212 Grade II* listed buildings in Bristol, England.

In England and Wales the authority for listing is granted by the Planning (Listed Buildings and Conservation Areas) Act 1990 and is administered by English Heritage, an agency of the Department for Digital, Culture, Media and Sport

In the United Kingdom the term listed building refers to a building or other structure officially designated as being of special architectural, historical or cultural significance.

Buildings 

|}

Notes

References

See also 

 Buildings and architecture of Bristol
 Grade I listed buildings in Bristol
 Grade II listed buildings in Bristol

 
Listed buildings in Bristol
Bristol